Glenn Harper (born September 12, 1962 in R.M. of Fort Garry, an area in Winnipeg, Manitoba), a former punter from 1986–1996 and from 2002–2003 for four Canadian Football League teams.

References 

 Career stats and Bio

1962 births
Living people
Calgary Stampeders players
Canadian football punters
Edmonton Elks players
Ottawa Renegades players
Players of Canadian football from Alberta
Canadian football people from Edmonton
Toronto Argonauts players
Washington State Cougars football players